Even Torkildsen Lande (1758 – 9 May 1833) was a Norwegian farmer and blacksmith. He served as a representative at the Norwegian Constitutional Assembly.

He was born at Bygland in Vest-Agder, Norway. He was raised on the  Åsen farm in the traditional rural district of Setesdal.  
In 1788, he married Gyro Torsdatter Lande. They lived on the Øvre Lande farm in Bygland. He died in 1833 and was buried at Årdal Church in Bygland (Årdal kyrkje i Bygland).

He represented Råbyggelaget (now Aust-Agder) at the Norwegian Constituent Assembly in 1814, together with Thomas Bryn and Ole Knudsen Tvedten. He supported the union party (Unionspartiet).

References

1758 births
1833 deaths
People from Bygland
Norwegian farmers
Fathers of the Constitution of Norway